Orbital 20 (stylised as 2Orbital) is a compilation album by electronic music duo Orbital.  It contains singles, album tracks and several new remixes.  The release is Orbital's third hits collection; this one commemorating the 20th anniversary of the band's first release. The album is frequently titled as 2Orbital or 20rbital on sites such as Amazon. The song 'Choice' is incorrectly listed as 'Midnight' on Spotify.

Track listing

Notes

External links

2009 greatest hits albums
Orbital (band) compilation albums
Rhino Records compilation albums